The 1852–53 United States Senate elections were held on various dates in various states,  coinciding with the 1852 presidential election. As these U.S. Senate elections were prior to the ratification of the Seventeenth Amendment in 1913, senators were chosen by state legislatures. Senators were elected over a wide range of time throughout 1852 and 1853, and a seat may have been filled months late or remained vacant due to legislative deadlock. In these elections, terms were up for the senators in Class 2.

The Democratic Party gained two seats in the Senate. Only six of the twenty senators up for election were re-elected.

Results summary 
Senate party division, 33rd Congress (1853–1855)

 Majority party: Democratic (35–38)
 Minority party: Whig Party (19–17)
 Other parties: Free Soiler (2–5); Know Nothing (1)
 Vacant: 5–1
 Total seats: 62

Change in composition

Before the elections

As a result of the elections

Race summaries

Special elections during the 32nd Congress 
In these elections, the winners were seated during 1852 or in 1853 before March 4; ordered by election date.

Elections leading to the 33rd Congress 
In these regular elections, the winners were elected for the term beginning March 4, 1853; ordered by state.

All of the elections involved the Class 2 seats.

Elections during the 33rd Congress 
In these elections, the winners were elected in 1853 on or after March 4; ordered by date.

Alabama

Alabama (regular) 

The legislature had failed to elect a senator for the other seat, previously held by Democrat Jeremiah Clemens.  On November 28, 1853, Democrat Clement Claiborne Clay was elected late to the seat.

Alabama (special, class 3) 

On December 20, 1852, Democrat William R. King resigned due to poor health.  On January 14, 1853, Democrat Benjamin Fitzpatrick was appointed to continue the term, and he was elected November 28, 1853 to finish the term.

Arkansas 

Democratic senator William K. Sebastian had been appointed May 12, 1848 to continue the term, to which he was elected later that year to finish.

Sebastian was re-elected to a full term in 1853.

California (special) 

The California legislature had failed to elect a successor to Democrat John C. Frémont in time for the 1851 beginning of the class 1 term.

In fact, this time it took eight ballots for Democrat John B. Weller (71 votes, 80.7%) to be elected January 30, 1852 over Whig Pierson B. Reading (17 votes, 19.3%).

Connecticut (special) 

The Connecticut legislature had failed to elect a senator for the term beginning in 1851.  Democrat Isaac Toucey was elected in May 1852 to finish the term.

Delaware 

First-term Whig Presley Spruance retired and Whig former senator John M. Clayton was elected January 12, 1853.

Clayton received 17 votes and there were 13 blank ballots cast.

Georgia 

Second-term Whig John M. Berrien resigned May 28, 1852 and Democrat Robert M. Charlton was appointed May 31, 1852 to finish the term.

Democrat Robert Toombs was elected in 1852 and would serve through re-election in 1858 and until he withdrew in 1861.

Illinois 

Two-term Democrat Stephen A. Douglas was re-elected January 5, 1853.  He would be re-elected in 1859 and serve until his 1861 death.

Indiana (special) 

First term Democrat James Whitcomb died December 4, 1852 and Democrat Charles W. Cathcart was appointed December 6, 1852, pending a special election to finish the term that would end in 1855.

Democrat John Pettit won the January 18, 1853 election.

Iowa 

First-term Democrat George Wallace Jones was re-elected to a second term.

He received the Democratic nomination on December 20, 1852 by the narrowest of margins: 30 to 29 votes.  The general election was held the next day, December 21, in which Jones easily won.

Kentucky 

One-term Whig Joseph R. Underwood retired from the class 2 seat and the Know Nothing Lieutenant Governor of Kentucky John Burton Thompson had already been elected early, December 15, 1851, far in advance of the 1853 term.

Louisiana

Louisiana (regular) 

Democrat Solomon W. Downs lost re-election to Whig businessman Judah P. Benjamin in January 1852. Some Whig newspapers thought Benjamin too young and inexperienced at forty, despite his undoubted talent, but the Whig legislative caucus selected him on the second ballot, and he was elected by the legislature.

Louisiana (special) 

First-term Democrat Pierre Soulé was appointed U.S. Minister to Spain and resigned April 11, 1853.

Former-Democratic congressman and diplomat John Slidell was elected April 28, 1853.

Slidell would be re-elected in 1858 and serve until he withdrew in 1861.

Maine 

First-term Democrat James W. Bradbury retired and the Maine legislature failed to elect his replacement until long after the new Congress began.  It wasn't until 1854 that a new senator would be elected.

Massachusetts 

Long-time senator Whig John Davis retired.  Whig U.S. Secretary of State and former Governor of Massachusetts Edward Everett was elected in 1853.

Everett was resign just one year into his term due to his distaste dealing with the politics of slavery and abolition.

Michigan 

First-term Democrat Alpheus Felch retired.  Fellow Democratic congressman  Charles E. Stuart was elected January 11, 1853, over Whig Mayor of Detroit Zachariah Chandler.

Stuart only served one term, retiring in 1859.  Chandler, meanwhile, would be elected to the other seat and serve for three terms.

Mississippi

Mississippi (special, class 1) 

Incumbent Democrat Jefferson Davis resigned in 1851 to run for Governor of Mississippi.  Democrat John J. McRae was appointed December 1, 1851 to continue Davis's term, pending a special election.  Democrat Stephen Adams won the March 17, 1852 special election to finish the term that would continue until 1857.

Mississippi (special, class 2) 

Incumbent Democrat Henry S. Foote resigned January 8, 1852 to become Governor of Mississippi.  Whig Walker Brooke was elected February 18, 1852 to finish the term that would end the following year.

Mississippi (regular) 

Brooke was not a candidate to the next term.

The Mississippi legislature failed to elect a replacement for Brooke, and the seat remained vacant until early 1854.

New Hampshire 

Free Soil senator John P. Hale ran for U.S. President, coming in third place in the popular vote, but failing to win any states.  He lost to the Democratic fellow-New Hampshire senator Franklin Pierce.  He then lost re-election to his senate seat when Democrats took over the New Hampshire legislature in 1852 state elections.

Democratic former-senator Charles G. Atherton was returned to the Senate in Hale's place on November 25, 1852.

Atherton died from pulmonary tuberculosis in the first year of his term.

After Republicans retook the New Hampshire legislature in 1854, Hale was re-elected to finish the term.

New Jersey

New Jersey (regular) 

Two-term Whig Jacob W. Miller lost re-election to Democratic former-Congressman William Wright.

Wright would lose re-election in 1859 but be returned to the Senate in 1863.

New Jersey (special) 

First-term Democrat Robert F. Stockton resigned from the Class 1 seat January 10, 1853 to become President of the Delaware and Raritan Canal Company.

Democrat John Renshaw Thomson was elected February 11, 1853 over Whig former-senator William L. Dayton to finish the term.

Thomson would be re-elected in 1857 to a full term and serve until his death in 1862.

North Carolina 

Long-time Whig Willie Mangum was a candidate for re-election.  Although Democratic former-congressman James C. Dobbin was a top choice of the North Carolina Legislature, no candidate received a majority of votes in either house, so the seat was left unfilled.

The seat would remain vacant until a 1854 special election.

Dobbin would then be appointed U.S. Secretary of the Navy and Magnum retired from public service.

Rhode Island 

The Rhode Island General Assembly failed to elect, so first-term Whig John Hopkins Clarke thereby lost re-election.

After the term began, Democrat Philip Allen was elected July 20, 1853, to fill the seat.  Allen would serve only one term, retiring in 1859.

South Carolina 

Democrat Robert Rhett resigned May 7, 1852 and Democratic judge of the chancery court William F. De Saussure was appointed May 10, 1852 to continue the term, pending a special election. The term would end in March 1853, so there was an election to finish the term and an election to the next term.

South Carolina (special) 

De Saussure was elected November 29, 1852, just to finish the term.

South Carolina (regular) 

Democrat Josiah J. Evans was elected December 1, 1852 on the fourth ballot to the next term.

Tennessee 

First-term Whig John Bell was re-elected October 29, 1853 on the 49th ballot.

Bell would fall out of favor with the Tennessee legislature over the sectionalism that was rife in the late 1850s and lost their vote for re-election.

Texas 

Two-term Democrat Sam Houston — a Texas founder who had served as senator since statehood — was re-elected January 15, 1853.

Houston would retire at the end of this term in 1859, and be replaced by John Hemphill.

Virginia 

First-term Democrat Robert M. T. Hunter was re-elected January 22, 1852.

Hunter would be re-elected again in 1858 and serve until his 1861 expulsion.

See also 
 1852 United States elections
 1852 United States presidential election
 1852–53 United States House of Representatives elections
 32nd United States Congress
 33rd United States Congress

Notes

References 
 Party Division in the Senate, 1789-Present, via Senate.gov